Manuel Maria Ferreira Carrilho (b. Viseu, 9 July 1951) is a Portuguese academic and politician.

Background
He lived in the city of Viseu until he was eighteen years old, where his father, Manuel Engrácia Carrilho, was Civil Governor and Mayor of the town.

Career
He graduated in Philosophy at Faculdade de Letras da Universidade de Lisboa in 1975, and pursued post-graduate studies at Faculdade de Ciências Sociais e Humanas of Universidade Nova de Lisboa, where he started an academic career. Became a Doctor in Contemporary Philosophy in 1985, Aggregated Professor in 1993, and Cathedratic Professor since 1994.

His main research field are the areas of philosophy of knowledge, philosophy of sciences, argumentative and rhetorical theories and problems in communication and politics. He collaborated in numerous academies and international institutions (such as the Collège International de Philosophie or the International Society for the Study of Argumentation).

Also created and directed the magazines Filosofia e Epistemologia (1979–1984) and Crítica (1987–1993), and wrote for Argumentation, Culture/Europe and Hermes.

Some of his main Works are Razão e Transmissão da Filosofia (1987), Elogio da Modernidade (1989) Rhétorique de la Modernité (1992), Aventuras da Interpretação (1995), Rationalités (1997), Hipóteses de Cultura (1999), O Estado da Nação (2001) and O Impasse Português (2005).

Out of the university, he has been occupying several civil and political functions. He’s a militant of the Portuguese Socialist Party since the 1980s, and became a member of its Political Committee in 1996.

From 1995 to 2000 he was the Portuguese Minister of Culture, a ministry that didn’t exist before him and which institutionalized and defined several main objectives as its main (and national) goals.

In 2000, after the socialists had lost the elections to Durão Barrosos’s PSD, he took a seat in the Portuguese Parliament. He there became a member of the Parliamentary Committees of Foreign Affairs and European Affairs, and (from 2002 to 2008) was also vice-president of the Socialist Party’s Parliamentary Group.

In 2005 he was the socialist’s candidate for Mayor of Lisbon, but lost to the social-democrat’s Carmona Rodrigues. Nonetheless, he took his seat as Councilman until 2006.

From April 2008 until September 2010 he was the Portuguese Permanent Representative at the UNESCO, in Paris.

He has been awarded the Picasso-Miró medal from the UNESCO in 1998 and the European Archaeological Heritage Prize in 1999. He has also been awarded the Spanish Gran Cruz da Orden de Merito Civil, by King Juan Carlos in 1996, the Brazilian Grã-Cruz da Ordem do Rio Branco, by president Fernando Henrique Cardoso in 1997, and distinguished as a Grand Officier of the Légion d' Honneur, by Jacques Chirac in 1999.

He has also been a regular columnist at French daily Le Monde and in the Portuguese newspapers Expresso, Público, Jornal de Letras, Artes e Ideias and Diário de Notícias, having recently started publishing in the last one a new Thursday column, untitled «A Boa Distância» (which can both mean «The Good Distance» and «From a Good Distance»).

Family
He has three children and was married to Portuguese TV host Bárbara Guimarães.

References

External links

Living people
Culture ministers of Portugal
Members of the Assembly of the Republic (Portugal)
Permanent Delegates of Portugal to UNESCO
1951 births
University of Lisbon alumni
People from Viseu
Portuguese politicians convicted of crimes